Kevin O'Connor (May 7, 1935 – June 22, 1991) was an American actor. He is best known for his roles in Let's Scare Jessica to Death (1971), Bogie (1980) and The Brink's Job (1978). He also acted extensively on stage, winning two Drama Desk Awards and an Obie Award.

O'Connor was born in Honolulu, Hawaii. He attended the University of Hawaii. He moved to New York City for his career, where he appeared in Broadway productions as an actor, as well as direct and teach. O'Connor also appeared on television in Hawaii Five-O and Tales from the Darkside as well as several television movies. He portrayed Humphrey Bogart in the 1980 biographical television movie Bogie. He appeared in two movies directed by Larry Cohen: 1984's Special Effects and It's Alive 3: Island of the Alive of (1987). He died in 1991 in New York City.

References

External links

 
 
 

1938 births
1991 deaths
American male film actors
American male stage actors
American male television actors
Male actors from Honolulu
20th-century American male actors
Drama Desk Award winners
Obie Award recipients